Guy Rétoré (7 April 1924 – 15 December 2018) was a French director.

Biography
In 1951, Rétoré created la Guilde, a French amateur theatre company. He later moved downtown into the Patronage Saint Pierre. Rétoré would rename it Théâtre de Ménilmontant. He would stay there for three years. Rétoré got la Guilde recognized as a permanent troupe, and moved it into théâtre de l'Est parisien in 1963. He became the next leader of the theatre.

In July 2001, Rétoré retired as director of théâtre de l'Est parisien, although there was a controversy over his replacement. After Jean-Paul Devois was a placeholder, Catherine Anne became the next director of the theatre.

Works

Theatre
Coquin de coq by Sean O'Casey (1975)

Movies
Section spéciale by Costa-Gavras

Television
Mourir pour Copernic by Bernard Sobel

References

1924 births
2018 deaths
French directors